The 2018–19 Angolan Basketball League was the 41st season of the Angolan Basketball League, the highest premier basketball league in Angola. On 19 May 2019, Petro de Luanda won its 13th league title, which meant qualification for the 2020 Basketball Africa League (BAL) season.

Teams
Helmarc Academia made its debut season.
<onlyinclude>{| class="wikitable sortable"  
|-
! Club
! Location
! Venue
! Capacity
|-
| ASA || Luanda || Pavilhão da Cidadela || align=center|
|-
| Helmarc Academia || Luanda || Pavilhão Multiusos do Kilamba || align=center | 
|-
| Interclube || Luanda || Pavilhão 28 de Fevereiro || align=center|
|-
| Marinha || Luanda || Pavilhão Victorino Cunha || align=center|
|-
| Petro de Luanda || Luanda || Pavilhão da Cidadela ||  align=center| 
|-
| Primeiro de Agosto || Luanda || Pavilhão Victorino Cunha || align=center| 
|-
|  Universidade Lusíada || Luanda || Pavilhão Anexo || align=center|
|-
|  Vila Clotilde || Luanda || Pavilhão Anexo || align=center|
|-
| Kwanza || Luanda || Pavilhão Victorino Cunha || align=center| 
|}

Regular season

Playoffs

Individual awards

References

External links
AfroBasket season page

Angolan Basketball League seasons
League
Angola